John W. Moore (1840 – 1917) was Mayor of Kansas City, Missouri in 1885 and a president of the Kansas City Board of Trade.

Biography
Moore was born in Kentucky and was raised near Blue Springs, Missouri.

After the American Civil War he had a freight business on the Santa Fe Trail and established an Eagle flour mill at 19th and Walnut.  He had residences at 1622 McGee Street and later 2508 East 31st Street.

References

1840 births
1917 deaths
Mayors of Kansas City, Missouri
People from Kentucky
19th-century American politicians
People from Blue Springs, Missouri